= Karl Coleman =

Irish association football goalkeeper

Personal information
- Date of birth: November 19, 1988 (age 37)
- Place of birth: Dublin, Ireland
- Position: Goalkeeper

Senior career*
Years	Team	Apps	(Gls)
2005–2007	UCD	0	(0)
2007–2009	Shamrock Rovers	3	(0)
- * Club domestic league appearances and goals

Karl Coleman (born 19 November 1988) is an Irish former association football goalkeeper. He first played for University College Dublin A. F. C. before making his debut with Shamrock Rovers on 18 April 2008. Karl parted company with The Hoops, by mutual consent, on 31 July 2009.
